Stéphane Gourichon (born August 5, 1977 in Angers) is a French sprint canoer who competed in the early 2000s. At the 2000 Summer Olympics in Sydney, he was eliminated in the semifinals of the K-4 1000 m event.

References
 Sports-Reference.com profile

External links
 

1977 births
Canoeists at the 2000 Summer Olympics
French male canoeists
Living people
Olympic canoeists of France
21st-century French people